The Bulletin of the Irish Biogeographical Society publishes many scientific papers on entomology and also entomological catalogues as Occasional Supplements . A full indexed list is provided on the website.

External links
Website of The Irish Biogeographical Society

Biology journals
Entomology journals and magazines